The 1923–24 Irish Cup was the 44th edition of the premier knock-out cup competition in Northern Irish football. 

Queen's Island won the tournament for the 1st time, defeating Willowfield 1–0 in the final at Windsor Park. While another team called Queen's Island founded in 1881 had previously won the cup in 1882, this was the only time the Queen's Island team founded in 1920 would appear in an Irish Cup final.

Results

First round

|}

Replay

|}

Quarter-finals

|}

Replay

|}

Second replay

|}

Semi-finals

|}

Replay

|}

Final

References

External links
 Northern Ireland Cup Finals. Rec.Sport.Soccer Statistics Foundation (RSSSF)

Irish Cup seasons
1923–24 domestic association football cups
1923–24 in Northern Ireland association football